Shape risk in finance is a type of basis risk when hedging a load profile with standard hedging products having a lower granularity.  In other words a commodity supplier wants to pre-purchase supplies for expected demand, but can only buy in fixed amounts that are bigger or smaller than the demand forecasted.  This means it has to either over order or under order and make up the difference at the time of delivery at the spot price which might be much higher.  Shape risk is also related to commodity risk.

For example an electricity provider has to produce or buy electricity in advance in order to distribute to its consumers based on forecasts i.e. how much energy will be consumed every minute on the following day. Such forecasts are usually based on the average historical consumption of the same set of customers; however, the provider can only produce e.g. only hourly blocks of electricity of 1MWh, and not smaller quantities. There is a certain financial risk that the provider produces too little energy and thus has to buy the remaining power from a market opponent for a high spot price to be able to fulfill the need of its customers.

References 

Market risk